Yaminawa (Yaminahua) is a Panoan language of western Amazonia. It is spoken by the Yaminawá and some related peoples.

Yaminawa constitutes an extensive dialect cluster.  Attested dialects are two or more Brazilian Yaminawa dialects, Peruvian Yaminawa, Chaninawa, Chitonawa, Mastanawa, Parkenawa (= Yora or "Nawa"), Shanenawa (Xaninaua, = Katukina de Feijó), Sharanawa (= Marinawa), Shawannawa (= Arara), Yawanawá, Yaminawa-arara (obsolescent; very similar to Shawannawa/Arara), Nehanawa†).

Very few Yaminawá speak Spanish or Portuguese, though the Shanenawa have mostly shifted to Portuguese.

Phonology 
The vowels of Yaminawa are /a, i, ɯ, u/. /i, ɯ, u/ can also be heard as [ɪ, ɨ, o]. Sharanawa, Yaminawa, and Yora have nasalized counterparts for each of the vowels, and demonstrate contrastive nasalization.

 is heard as an allophone of /ɾ/. /j/ can also be heard as a nasal .

Yawanawá has a similar phonemic inventory to Yaminawa, but uses a voiced bilabial fricative  in place of the voiceless bilabial fricative . Yawanawá and Sharanahua have an additional phoneme, the voiced labio-velar approximant .

Yaminawa has contrastive tone, with two surface tones, high (H) and low (L).

Grammar
Yaminawa is a polysynthetic, primarily suffixing language that also uses compounding, nasalization, and tone alternations in word-formation. Yaminawa exhibits split ergativity; nouns and third person pronouns pattern along ergative-absolutive lines, while first and second person pronouns pattern along nominative-accusative lines. Yaminawa verbal morphology is extensive, encoding affective (emotional) meanings and categories like associated motion. Yaminawa also has a set of switch reference enclitics that encode same or different subject relationships as well as aspectual relationships between the dependent (marked) clause and the main clause.

Notes

External links
Yaminahua language dictionary online from IDS
Sharanahua Language Collection of Pierre Déléage (includes myths, shamanistic songs, and ceremonial songs) at the Archive of the Indigenous Languages of Latin America (AILLA). 
Yaminahua (Intercontinental Dictionary Series)

Panoan languages
Indigenous languages of Western Amazonia
Languages of Bolivia
Languages of Peru
Languages of Brazil